George Davidson (8 October 1898 – 25 September 1948) was a New Zealand sprinter and rugby league player. He competed in the 1920 Summer Olympics and finished fifth in the 200 metres competition. He also participated in the 100 metres event where he was eliminated in the quarter-finals. His Olympic participation was hindered due to the time it took to travel from NZ to Belgium for the games. American athletic coach Ike Kelly said of Davidson that if he was able to coach him for 6 months, he would have turned him into a world champion.

Davidson's brothers Bill and Ben both represented New Zealand at rugby league, and George himself played for the City and Maritime clubs in the Auckland Rugby League competition and represented Auckland between 1919 and 1922.

George Davidson played for Maritime but after returning from the Antwerp Olympics he requested a transfer to join his brothers on the City Rovers team. Maritime opposed this but the Auckland Rugby League requested that they reconsider and during the 1922 season he was granted a transfer.

He was associated with Sharland and Company Limited for 21 years before leaving in February 1938.

References

Further reading

 

1898 births
1948 deaths
Athletes (track and field) at the 1920 Summer Olympics
Olympic athletes of New Zealand
New Zealand male sprinters
New Zealand rugby league players
Auckland rugby league team players
Maritime Football Club players
City Rovers players
Rugby league wingers